The most important Romanian river ports are:

Orșova
performing capacity: 1.200.000 to/year
Quay  length – 500 linear meters – 5 anchording place

Calafat
performing capacity: 350.000 to/year
Quay length – 100 linear meters –1 anchoring place

Cetate
performing capacity: 70.000 to/year
Quay length – 100 linear meters - 1anchording place

Gruia
performing capacity: 70.000 to/year
Quay length – 100 linear meters – 1 anchoring place

Hârșova
performing capacity: 70.000 to/year
Quay length  - 100 linear meters - 1 anchoring place

Drencova
performing capacity: 100.000 to/year
Quay length  - 100 linear meters - 1 anchoring place

Moldova Veche
performing capacity: 350.000 to/year
Quay length  - 300 linear meters - 3 anchoring place

Brăila
performing capacity: 4.500.000 to/year
Quay length  - between 100–400 linear meters - 10 anchoring place
Quay length  - between 400–700 linear meters - 9 anchoring place

Galați
performing capacity: 17.075.000 to/year
Quay length  - 200 linear meters - 8 anchoring place
Quay length  - 800 linear meters - 8 anchoring place

Tulcea
performing capacity: 800.000 to/year
Quay length  - between 100–300 linear meters - 4 anchoring place
Quay length  - 400 linear meters - 4 anchoring place

Drobeta-Turnu Severin

Corabia

Zimnicea

Bechet

Turnu Măgurele

Giurgiu

Oltenita

Călărași

Cernavodă

Chilia Veche

Mahmudia

Isaccea

Măcin

Smârdan

See also
Galați
Brăila
Tulcea

River ports of Romania